Alan Sherman (born 22 October 1951) is a coxswain who competed for Great Britain.

Rowing career
Sherman was selected by Great Britain as part of the lightweight eight that secured a bronze medal at the 1975 World Rowing Championships.

References

1951 births
Living people
British male rowers
World Rowing Championships medalists for Great Britain
Coxswains (rowing)
Paralympic bronze medalists for Great Britain
Rowers at the 2008 Summer Paralympics
Medalists at the 2008 Summer Paralympics
Paralympic medalists in rowing
Paralympic rowers of Great Britain